Stephen Robert Leone (born May 19, 1948) is an American physical chemist and the John R. Thomas Endowed Chair in Physical Chemistry at the University of California, Berkeley.

Early life and education 
Leone was born in Queens, New York City on May 19, 1948, of Italian descent. The family moved to Rochester, New Hampshire, and later Batavia, Illinois, where Stephen attended primary and secondary school. Leone earned a bachelor's degree from Northwestern University and spent a summer working at Lawrence Livermore National Laboratory prior to attending the University of California, Berkeley for graduate study. In 1974, Leone began teaching at the University of Southern California, and later moved to JILA, a research institute at the University of Colorado Boulder. Leone returned to Berkeley in 2002. He was editor of the Annual Review of Physical Chemistry from 2002–2011, retiring as editor in 2011; and is credited for organizing the volumes for 2012–2013.

Awards and honors 
Over the course of his career, Leone has received the ACS Award in Pure Chemistry (1982) and Peter Debye Award (2005) from the American Chemical Society, the Bourke Award (1995) and Polanyi Medal (2010) from the Royal Society of Chemistry and the Herbert P. Broida Prize (1989) of the American Physical Society, among several others. He has been awarded Sloan and Guggenheim fellowships, and was elected a member of the United States National Academy of Sciences in 1995.

References

1948 births
Living people
20th-century American chemists
21st-century American chemists
University of California, Berkeley alumni
UC Berkeley College of Chemistry faculty
Northwestern University alumni
People from Queens, New York
Scientists from New York City
People from Batavia, Illinois
People from Rochester, New Hampshire
Members of the United States National Academy of Sciences
Sloan Research Fellows
American people of Italian descent
Lawrence Livermore National Laboratory staff
University of Colorado Boulder faculty
Fellows of the American Physical Society
Annual Reviews (publisher) editors